The London postal district is the area in England of  to which mail addressed to the London post town is delivered. The General Post Office under the control of the Postmaster General directed Sir Rowland Hill to devise the area in 1856 and throughout its history it has been subject to reorganisation and division into increasingly smaller postal units, with the early loss of two compass points and a minor retraction in 1866. It was integrated by the Post Office into the national postcode system of the United Kingdom during the early 1970s and corresponds to the E, EC, N, NW, SE, SW, W and WC postcode areas. The postal district has also been known as the London postal area.

History

Origins

By the 1850s, the rapid growth of the metropolitan area meant it became too large to operate efficiently as a single post town. A Post Office inquiry into the problem had been set up in 1837 and a House of Commons committee was initiated in 1843. In 1854 Charles Canning, the Postmaster General, set up a committee at the Post Office in St. Martin's Le Grand to investigate how London could best be divided for the purposes of directing mail. In 1856, of the 470 million items of mail sent in the United Kingdom during the year, approximately one fifth (100 million) were for delivery in London and half of these (50 million items) also originated there.

The General Post Office under the control of the Postmaster General devised the area in 1856.   Sir Rowland Hill produced an almost perfectly circular area of  radius from the central post office at St. Martin's Le Grand in central London. As originally devised, it extended from Waltham Cross in the north to Carshalton in the south and from Romford in the east to Sunbury in the west — six counties at the time if including the City of London. Within the district it was divided into two central areas and eight compass points which operated much like separate post towns. Each was named "London" with a suffix (EC, WC, N, NE, E, SE, S, SW, W, and NW) indicating the area it covered; each had a separate head office. The system was introduced during 1857 and completed on 1 January 1858.

Abolition of NE and S divisions and retraction of E division
During the 1860s, following an official report by Anthony Trollope, the E division subsumed the original NE division (which became defunct) and the S division was split between the SE and SW divisions. In 1866, NE was abolished; large districts transferred to E included Walthamstow, Wanstead and Leytonstone. The remaining eight letter prefixes (excluding all numbers) were not changed. In 1868 the S district was abolished and split between SE and SW.

At the same time, the London postal district boundary was retracted in the east, when some Essex areas, including around Ilford, became part of other postal towns.

The NE and S codes have been re-used in the national postcode system and now refer to the NE postcode area around Newcastle upon Tyne and the S postcode area around Sheffield.

Numbered divisions

In 1917, as a wartime measure to improve efficiency, the districts were further subdivided with a number applied to each sub-district. This was achieved by designating a sub-area served most conveniently by the head office in each district "1" and then allocating the rest alphabetically by the name of the location of each delivery office. Exceptionally, W2 and SW11 are also 'head districts'.

The boundaries of each sub-district rarely correspond to any units of civil administration: the parishes and hamlets/chapelries with chapels that traditionally define settlement names everywhere in England and Wales or the generally larger boroughs; despite this, postal sub-districts have developed over time into a primary reference frame. The numbered sub-districts became the "outward code" (first half) of the postcode system as expanded into longer codes during the 1970s.

Changes
Ad hoc changes have taken place to the organisation of the districts, such as the creation of SE28 from existing districts because of the construction of the high-density Thamesmead development.

High-density districts
Subdivisions of postcode sub-districts
Owing to heavier demand, seven high-density postcode districts in central London have been subdivided to create new, smaller postcode districts. This is achieved by adding a letter after the original postcode district, for example W1P. Where such sub-districts are used elsewhere such as on street signs and maps, the original unsuffixed catch-all versions often remain in use instead. The districts subdivided are E1, N1, EC (EC1, EC2, EC3, EC4) SW1, W1, WC1 and WC2 (each with several subdivisions).  Similarly, there are solely non-geographic suffixed sub-districts for PO boxes in NW1 (e.g. NW1W) and SE1 (e.g. SE1P).

Relationship to London boundary

The London postal district has never been aligned with the London boundary. When the initial system was designed, the London boundary was restricted to the square mile of the small, ancient City of London. The wider metropolitan postal area covered parts of Middlesex, Surrey, Kent, Essex and Hertfordshire.

In 1889 a County of London, which was smaller than the postal district, was created from parts of Middlesex, Surrey and Kent.  The bulk of 40 fringe sub-districts (having been numbered in 1917) lay outside its boundary including, for example: Leyton, Ealing, Totteridge and Wimbledon

In 1965 the creation of Greater London boundary went beyond these postal districts except for part of the parish of Waltham Holy Cross. The General Post Office was unwilling to follow this change and expand the postal district to match because of the cost. Places in London's outer boroughs such as Harrow, Barnet, Wembley, Enfield, Ilford, Romford, Bexleyheath, Bromley, Hounslow, Richmond, Croydon, Sutton, Kingston and Uxbridge are therefore covered by parts of twelve adjoining postcode areas (EN, IG, RM, DA, BR, TN, CR, SM, KT, TW, HA and UB) from postal districts of 5 different counties including Middlesex whose county council was abolished upon the creation of the Greater London Council.

Royal Mail has a seemingly settled policy of changing postcodes only if there is an operational advantage to doing so, unlike the postal services of other countries , and so has no plan to change the postcode system to correlate with the Greater London boundary . In 2003 the then Mayor of London expressed support for revision of postal addresses in Greater London.  Equally organisations on the fringes of the London postal district have lobbied to be excluded or included in an attempt to decrease their insurance premiums (SE2→DA7) or raise the prestige of their business (IG1-IG6→E19). This is generally futile as Royal Mail changes postcodes only in order to facilitate the delivery of post, and not to illustrate geographical boundaries like the postal services of other countries.

The London postal district includes all of the City of London, Camden, Hackney, Hammersmith and Fulham, Haringey, Islington, Kensington and Chelsea, Southwark, Tower Hamlets, Wandsworth and Westminster. Almost entirely included are Greenwich, Lambeth, Lewisham, Newham and Waltham Forest, except for a few streets. Barking and Dagenham, Barnet, Bexley, Brent, Bromley, Croydon, Ealing, Enfield, Harrow, Hounslow, Kingston upon Thames, Merton, Redbridge, and Richmond upon Thames are partly in the postal district. Havering, Hillingdon and Sutton are completely outside the postal district. Sewardstone, in postal district E4 and in the Epping Forest District of Essex is anomalously the only place to be outside Greater London but in the London postal area.

Under early abandoned price differentials it formed the inner area of the London postal region, one now obscure definition of Inner London — the term has however lost economic significance from the consumer viewpoint with the standardisation of Royal Mail pricing.

Significance
It is common to use postal sub-districts as placenames in London, particularly in the property market: a property may be described as being "in N11", especially where this can be synonymous with a desirable location but also covers other less prestigious places. Thus sub-districts are a convenient shorthand indicator towards social status, such that a 'desirable' postcode may add significantly to the value of property, and property developers have tried to no avail to have Royal Mail alter the boundaries of postal districts so that new developments will sound as though they are in a richer area, whether in capital, personal income or both.

Parliament, which first established the London postal district, then created the narrower County of London (1889–1965) and replaced it with the much larger Greater London. However, there has been very little change in London postal district boundaries. Being in a London postcode inaccurately gives a broad definition of Inner London.

Presentation
All London postal districts were traditionally prefixed with the post town 'LONDON' and full stops were commonly placed after each character, e.g. LONDON S.W.1.
Use of the full stops ended with the implementation of the national postcode system .  In addition, integration of the London postal districts into postcodes means that as postcodes should be on a separate address line (in line with other postcodes in the national system) the postal district should not now appear after LONDON on the same line but as the first part of the full postcode.

The presentation of the postal districts on street signs in London is commonplace, although not universal as each borough is individually responsible for street signs . Current regulations date from 1952 and were originally for the County of London, but were extended to Greater London in 1965. The section relating to postal districts reads "The appropriate postal district shall be indicated in the nameplate in signal red".

List of London postal districts
The postcode district names refer to the original delivery office.Map of London district names and numbers, from the 1963 edition of Bartholomew's Reference Atlas of Greater London Some postcode districts have been further subdivided. The postcode area articles give the full coverage of each district.

Map

London postal region

The E, EC, N, NW, SE, SW, W and WC postcode areas (the eight London postal districts) comprise the inner area of the London postal region and correspond to the London post town.

The BR, CM, CR, DA, EN, HA, IG, SL, TN, KT, RM, SM, TW, UB, and WD (the 15 outer London postcode areas) comprise the outer area of the London postal region.

The inner and outer areas together comprised the London postal region.

References

External links 
Additional information
 Postcodes, British Postal Museum and Archive

Maps
 All postcode areas and districts in Greater London from the Crystalroof website.
 Map of London in 1859 with NE and S districts shown
 Map of districts in 1900
 Map of London district names and numbers, from the 1963 edition of Bartholomew's Reference Atlas of 
 Clickable map of London districts with coordinates

Postal district
Postcodes in the United Kingdom